Itelmenite is a rare sulfate mineral with the formula Na4Mg3Cu3(SO4)8. It is one of many fumarolic minerals discovered on the Tolbachik volcano.

Relation to other minerals
Saranchinaite and dravertite are examples of other anhydrous complex copper-bearing sulfates, also coming from the Tolbachik volcano.

External links
 Itelmenite on Mindat:

References

Sulfate minerals
Copper(II) minerals
Sodium minerals
Magnesium minerals
Orthorhombic minerals
Minerals in space group 61